Moonbird is a 1959 short animated film by John Hubley and Faith Hubley in which two boys have an adventure in the middle of the night as they sneak out and try to catch a 'Moonbird' and bring it home. The film was animated by Robert Cannon and Ed Smith. It won an Oscar for Best Short Subjects (Cartoons) at the 32nd Academy Awards, in 1960.

Production
Moonbird featured the voices of the Hubley's sons, Mark and Ray ("Hampy"). For the Moonbird, the Hubleys secretly recorded the boys sharing an imaginary adventure before going to sleep in the darkness of their room. Their parents afterwards took the tapes and created an animated film to fit their sons' story.

Accolades
It became the very first independent short to win the Oscar.

Synopsis
The cartoon shows the little boys climbing out their bedroom window and going on a quest for the Moonbird, trying to trap the Moonbird, and otherwise obsessed with the Moonbird which we see following them about from place to place, leaping in and out of their trap, and in general keeping an eye on them.

Availability
The film has lapsed into the public domain.

The Academy Film Archive preserved Moonbird in 2003.

References

External links

Moonbird on YouTube

1959 films
1959 animated films
1950s animated short films
Animated films about birds
Best Animated Short Academy Award winners
Films directed by John Hubley
American animated short films
Animated films about animals
1950s English-language films
1950s American films
1959 independent films